The Dry Andes is a climatic and glaciological subregion of the Andes. Together with the Wet Andes it is one of the two subregions of the Argentine and Chilean Andes. The Dry Andes runs from the Atacama Desert in northern Chile and Northwest Argentina south to a latitude of 35°S in Chile. In Argentina the Dry Andes reaches 40°S due to the leeward effect of the Andes. According to Luis Lliboutry
the Dry Andes can be defined by the distribution of penitentes. The southernmost well developed penitentes are found on Lanín Volcano.

Rock glaciers occur in parts of the Dry Andes, but are lacking in the more southern Wet Andes. In the Dry Andes, ordinary glaciers develop usually at higher altitudes than rock glaciers. Around Aconcagua rock glaciers reach altitudes as a low as 900 m a.s.l.

The Principal Cordillera near Santiago may have been subject to significant glaciation as early as 1 million years ago, as indicated by the development of glacial valleys.

Paleogeography, paleoclimatology and paleoglaciology
Though precipitation increases with the height, there are semiarid conditions in the nearly  towering mountains of the Andes. This dry steppe climate is considered to be of the subtropic type at 32-34° S. In the valley bottoms only dwarf shrubs grow. The largest glaciers, e.g. the Plomo glacier and the Horcones glacier, do not reach  in length the ice thickness is not very significant. During glacial times however, c. 20,000 years ago, the glaciers were over ten times longer. The massifs of Cerro Aconcagua , Cerro Tupungato  and Nevado Juncal  are situated deca-kilometres away from each other and were connected by a joint ice stream network. The climatic glacier snowline (ELA) was lowered from the current  to  during glacial times.

References

Andes
Ecology of the Andes
Climate of Argentina
Climate of Chile
Climatic and glaciological subregions of the Andes
Glaciers of Chile